Jason Kenneth Gorskie (born 29 September 1989) is an American former soccer player who played as a defender.

Career

In 2013, Gorskie signed for Polish side Wisła Puławy. Before the 2015 season, he signed for Lyn in Norway. In 2015, he signed for Maltese second tier club Pietà Hotspurs. In 2016, Gorskie signed for Bnei Sakhnin in the Israeli top flight, where he made 3 appearances and scored 0 goals. On 31 July 2016, he debuted for Bnei Sakhnin during a 2–2 draw with Hapoel Haifa.

References

External links

1989 births
American expatriate soccer players
American expatriate sportspeople in Israel
American expatriate sportspeople in Malta
American expatriate sportspeople in Norway
American expatriate sportspeople in Poland
American people of Israeli descent
American people of Polish descent
American soccer players
Association football defenders
Bnei Sakhnin F.C. players
Expatriate footballers in Israel
Expatriate footballers in Malta
Expatriate footballers in Norway
Expatriate footballers in Poland
II liga players
Jewish American sportspeople
Living people
Lyn Fotball players
Maltese Challenge League players
Norwegian Second Division players
Penn Quakers men's soccer players
Pietà Hotspurs F.C. players
University of Pennsylvania alumni
USL League Two players
Wisła Puławy players